Thundercoaster is a wooden roller coaster located at TusenFryd in Vinterbro, Norway. It is Norway's only wooden roller coaster.

Characteristics

Track

One cycle of the ride lasts approximately two minutes.

Trains
Thundercoaster originally ran with trains from Vekoma. Each train had four cars seating six riders each in two rows of two. However, for the 2015 season, these trains were replaced by Timberliner trains from Cincinnati, Ohio-based Gravitykraft Corporation. The coaster now uses two trains, each of which has 12 cars seating two riders; this allows for a total of 24 riders per train.

References

Roller coasters in Norway